The International U-21 Thanh Niên Newspaper Cup is an annual football tournament held in Vietnam. The tournament was officially launched in 2007 by Thanh Niên News in co-operation with the Vietnam Football Federation, with the aim of improving youth football in Vietnam. In addition to improving the quality of football in the country, the tournament also serve to help VFF selectors build up the next generation of players who would represent Vietnam at the senior and U23 levels.

During the first edition of the tournament, which lasted from 24 to 28 October 2007, host nation Vietnam competed against four visiting teams from Indonesia, Myanmar, Singapore and Thailand. Vietnam won the first edition of the tournament, with Thailand finishing as runners-up.

Results

References 

International association football competitions hosted by Vietnam
2007 establishments in Vietnam
Recurring sporting events established in 2007